Brian James Dutcher (born October 30, 1959) is an American college basketball coach and is the head coach for the San Diego State men's basketball team.

Coaching career
Dutcher has more than 30 years of coaching experience, including 18 seasons as an assistant to Steve Fisher at San Diego State preceded by nine at the University of Michigan. Dutcher joined then-interim coach Fisher in 1989 when Michigan won the national championship. Dutcher is credited for having a central role in recruiting the Fab Five to Michigan and for bringing Kawhi Leonard to San Diego State. Dutcher was named San Diego State's "head coach in waiting" in 2011. Following Fisher's decision to retire, Dutcher was formally named as his replacement on April 11, 2017.

Thanks to Dutcher bringing in transfers Malachi Flynn, Yanni Wetzell, K.J. Feagin, and Trey Pulliam, along with the development of returnees Matt Mitchell, Jordan Shackel, Nathan Mensah, and Adam Seiko, the Aztecs started the 2019-20 season 26-0, with impressive road/neutral site wins over BYU, Creighton, Iowa, and Utah State - the preseason Mountain West favorite. This resulted in a #4 ranking for five straight weeks for SDSU while Dutcher was named to the Naismith Coach of the Year Late-Season Watch List. Dutcher was named Mountain West Conference Coach of the Year on March 3, 2020.

Personal life
Dutcher and his wife, Jan, have two daughters: Erin and Liza. He is the son of Jim Dutcher, a former head coach at Eastern Michigan and Minnesota.

Head coaching record

References

1959 births
Living people
American men's basketball coaches
Basketball coaches from Michigan
College men's basketball head coaches in the United States
High school basketball coaches in the United States
Illinois Fighting Illini men's basketball coaches
Michigan Wolverines men's basketball coaches
People from Alpena, Michigan
People from Bloomington, Minnesota
San Diego State Aztecs men's basketball coaches
South Dakota State Jackrabbits men's basketball coaches
University of Minnesota alumni